Champs are a UK based band formed of two brothers, Michael and David Champion.

Their first album, Down Like Gold, was released in 2014.

Their second album, Vamala, was released in 2015.

Their third album, The Hard Interchange, was released in September 2019. The album was created over a span of three years.

References

British pop rock music groups
Musical groups established in 2012
2012 establishments in England